Sandra Temporelli (born 25 January 1969) is a French former cyclist. She competed in the women's cross-country event at the 1996 Summer Olympics.

References

External links
 

1969 births
Living people
French female cyclists
Olympic cyclists of France
Cyclists at the 1996 Summer Olympics
Place of birth missing (living people)
Sportspeople from Montreuil, Seine-Saint-Denis
Cyclists from Île-de-France